Whosoever Shall Offend is a 1919 British silent crime film directed by Arrigo Bocchi and starring Kenelm Foss, Mary Odette and Mary Marsh Allen. The screenplay concerns a man murders his wife in Italy and then tries to marry a wealthy women.

Cast
 Kenelm Foss as Guido Falco  
 Mary Odette as Aurora  
 Mary Marsh Allen as Regina  
 Hayford Hobbs as Marcello Consalvi 
 Evelyn Harding as Signora Consalvi  
 Charles Vane as Ercole  
 Maud Cressall as Countess Del Armi  
 Barbara Everest as Maddalena  
 Philip Hewland as Professor Kalmon 
 Joyce Templeton as Regina (child)

References

Bibliography
 Low, Rachael. History of the British Film, 1918-1929. George Allen & Unwin, 1971.

External links

1919 films
1919 crime drama films
British silent feature films
British crime drama films
Films set in Italy
Films directed by Arrigo Bocchi
Films based on American novels
Films based on works by Francis Marion Crawford
British black-and-white films
1910s English-language films
1910s British films
Silent crime drama films